Rama Cont is  the  Professor of Mathematical Finance at the  
University of Oxford.

He is known for contributions to probability theory, stochastic analysis and mathematical modelling in finance, in particular mathematical models of systemic risk.
He was awarded the Louis Bachelier Prize  by the French Academy of Sciences in 2010.

Biography
Born in Tehran (Iran),  Cont obtained his undergraduate degree from Ecole Polytechnique  (France), a master's degree in theoretical physics from Ecole Normale Superieure and a degree in Chinese Language from Institut national des langues et civilisations orientales. His doctoral thesis focused on the application of Lévy processes in financial modelling.

Career and achievements
Cont started his career as a CNRS researcher in applied mathematics at Ecole Polytechnique (France) in 1998 and held academic positions at Ecole Polytechnique, Columbia University and Imperial College London. He was appointed 'Directeur de Recherche CNRS' (CNRS Senior Research Scientist) in 2008 and was  chair of mathematical finance at Imperial College London from 2012 to 2018. He was elected  Statutory Professor in Mathematical Finance at the Oxford Mathematical Institute and professorial fellow of St Hugh's College, Oxford in 2018.

Cont's research  focuses on probability theory, stochastic analysis and mathematical modelling in finance.
His mathematical work focuses on pathwise methods in stochastic analysis  and the Functional Ito calculus.

In quantitative finance he is known in particular for his work on models based on jump processes, the stochastic modelling of limit order books as queueing systems

, machine learning methods in finance 
and the mathematical modelling of systemic risk.

He was editor in chief of the Encyclopedia of Quantitative Finance.

Cont has served as advisor to central banks and international organizations such as the International Monetary Fund and the Bank for International Settlements on stress testing and systemic risk monitoring. His work on network models, financial stability and central clearing  has influenced central banks and regulators
.
He has given numerous media interviews

 on issues related to systemic risk and financial regulation.

Scientific  contributions

Systemic risk modeling

Work by Cont and his collaborators on mathematical modeling of systemic risk and financial stability, in particular on network models of financial contagion and the modeling of indirect contagion via 'fire sales', has influenced academic research and policy in this area.

Central clearing

Cont's research on central clearing in over-the-counter (OTC) markets has influenced  risk management  practices of central counterparties and regulatory thinking on central clearing. Cont has argued that central clearing does not eliminate counterparty risk but transforms it into liquidity risk, therefore risk management and stress testing of central counterparties should focus on liquidity risk and liquidity resources, not capital.

Risk measurement and Model risk

Cont introduced a rigorous  approach for the assessment of model risk
 which has been influential in the design of model risk management frameworks in financial institutions. 

Cont, Deguest and Scandolo introduced   the concept of 'risk measurement procedure',  an empirical counterpart of the notion of risk measure, and defined a robust class of risk measurement procedures known as 'Range Value-at-risk' (RVaR), a robust alternative to Expected shortfall.

Cont, Kotlicki and Valderrama define the concept of Liquidity at risk,  as the amount of liquid assets needed by a financial institution to face liquidity outflows in this scenario.

Awards and honours

Cont was awarded the Louis Bachelier Prize by the French Academy of Sciences in 2010 for his work on mathematical modelling of financial markets.
He was elected Fellow of the Society for Industrial and Applied Mathematics (SIAM) in 2017  for "contributions to stochastic analysis and mathematical finance".
He received  the  Award for Excellence in Interdisciplinary Research (APEX) from the Royal Society in 2017 for his research on mathematical modelling of systemic risk.

Publications

 
 
  Alt URL

References

External links
Professional Homepage
 
 

1972 births
Living people
People associated with the University of Oxford
École Polytechnique alumni
21st-century Iranian mathematicians
Applied mathematicians
Probability theorists
Fellows of St Hugh's College, Oxford
Fellows of the Society for Industrial and Applied Mathematics
Academics of the University of Oxford
Statutory Professors of the University of Oxford
Columbia University faculty